Big Brother may refer to:

 Big Brother (Nineteen Eighty-Four), a character from George Orwell's novel Nineteen Eighty-Four
 Authoritarian personality, any omnipresent figure representing oppressive control
 Big Brother Awards, a satirical award for acts against personal privacy
 Big Brother Watch, a UK pressure group
 Surveillance
 Surveillance state
 An older brother, see birth order

Organisations 
Big Brother Movement

Music 
 "Big Brother" (David Bowie song)
 "Big Brother" (Kanye West song)
 Big Brother and the Holding Company, an American band
 Big Brother & the Holding Company (album), a 1967 album by the band of the same name
 Big Brother Recordings, a UK record label
 "Big Brother", a 2004 song by Girls Aloud from What Will the Neighbours Say?
 "Big Brother", a song by Morten Abel
 "Big Brother", a song by Reset from No Limits
 "Big Brother", a song by Stevie Wonder from Talking Book

Television 
 Big Brother (franchise), a reality television series with numerous franchised international versions

Episodes 
 "Big Brother" (The Andy Griffith Show)
 "Big Brother" (Are You Being Served?)
 "Big Brother" (CSI: Miami)
 "Big Brother" (Glee)
 "Big Brother" (Only Fools and Horses)
 "Big Brother" (Yes Minister)

Other media 
 Big Brother (1923 film), a lost 1923 American drama silent film
 Big Brother (2007 film), a 2007 Bollywood film
 Big Brother (2015 film), a 2015 Bangladeshi film
 Big Brother (2018 film), a 2018 Hong Kong film starring Donnie Yen
 Big Brother (2020 film), a 2020 Indian Malayalam-language film
 Big Brother (magazine), a skateboarding culture magazine
 Big Brother (software), a tool for systems and network monitoring
 Big Brother: A Novel, a 2013 novel by Lionel Shriver

See also 

 Brother (disambiguation)
 Sister (disambiguation)
 "My Big Brother" (Scrubs), an episode of the comedy
 Very Big Brother, a Blue Origin orbital spacelaunch rocket
 Little Brother (disambiguation)
 Little Sister (disambiguation)
 Big Sister (disambiguation)
 Big Brothers Big Sisters (disambiguation)